Hilda Margaret Thompson (26 March 1919 – 16 June 2004) was a New Zealand cricketer who played as an all-rounder, batting left-handed and bowling left-arm medium. She played in one Test match for New Zealand in 1948. She played domestic cricket for Auckland.

References

External links
 
 

1919 births
2004 deaths
Cricketers from Wellington City
New Zealand women cricketers
New Zealand women Test cricketers
Auckland Hearts cricketers